Zoya Grancharova (Bulgarian: Зоя Грънчарова) is a former Bulgarian artistic gymnast. She won the bronze medal on floor exercise at the 1981 World Championships.

Competitive history

References

Bulgarian female artistic gymnasts
Medalists at the World Artistic Gymnastics Championships
Year of birth missing (living people)
Living people